Ramphocorixa acuminata, the acuminate water boatman, is a species of water boatman in the family Corixidae. It is found in Central America and North America.

References

Further reading

 

Articles created by Qbugbot
Insects described in 1897
Corixini